Waterplace Towers is the name of a high-rise residential condominium project in Providence, Rhode Island. The project completed construction in mid-2008, and was developed by Intercontinental Real Estate Corporation.

The price range for units in the $100 million complex will start at $300,000 and top out at "more than $1 million." Waterplace is named for its location, abutting the Waterplace Park, which hosts Providence's popular Waterfire events. Private balconies and/or window views of Waterfire are expected to be a major selling point for the complex. Underground parking patrolled hourly. Waterplace is one of two recently completed luxury high-rise condominium complexes in downtown Providence, the other being The Residences Providence.

The buildings are officially the 7th and 12th-tallest buildings in Providence. The towers finished construction in mid-2008.

Gallery

References 
 Providence Journal, "A Special Day at the Park for Luxury Condos", May 10, 2005.

External links 
Official website

Residential skyscrapers in Providence, Rhode Island
Residential buildings completed in 2008
Residential condominiums in the United States
2008 establishments in Rhode Island